The Canadian Screen Award for Best Lead Performance in a Drama Series is an annual award, presented by the Academy of Canadian Cinema and Television as part of the Canadian Screen Awards program, to honour the best leading performance in a Canadian television comedy series.

It is a merger of the former awards for Best Actor in a Drama Series and Best Actress in a Drama Series, following the academy's announcement in August 2022 that it would start presenting gender-neutral acting awards instead of gendered ones.

2020s

References

Lead Performance, Drama
Awards established in 2023